Zalavár is a village in Hungary, located in Zala County.

Name
According to written sources the settlement was called 'Mosapurc' in the 9th century, "Mosapurc regia civitate". It was also known as Moosburg, Urbs Paludarum, Braslavespurch and Blatengrad in medieval records. The medieval settlement is known in modern sources as Blatnohrad (Slovak), Blatnograd, Блатноград (Serbo-Croatian and Bulgarian). Ján Kollár called it Salavár in his travel book and described the state of the ruins in 1841.

History
In the 9th century, Mosapurc or Moosburg was a fortified settlement built at the Zala river and was the capital of the Frankish vassal Lower Pannonian Principality ruled by a Slavic prince Pribina ("Privinae civitas, munimen, castrum in nemore et palude Salae" in a Salzburg chronicle). During the reign of Pribina's son, prince Kocel (861-876), in the summer of 867, it provided short-term hospitality to brothers Cyril and Methodius on their way from Great Moravia to the pope in Rome to justify the use of the Slavonic language as a liturgical language. They and their disciples turned Blatnograd into one of the centers that spread the knowledge of the new Slavonic script (Glagolitic alphabet) and literature, educating numerous future missionaries in their native language.

Battle of Pressburg
Specialists claim that Urbs Paludarum, Brazlavo's burg (Moosburg), was the place of the Battle of Pressburg, instead of Bratislava. The only contemporary source mentioning a location of the battle is the Annales iuvavenses maximi (Annals of Salzburg); however, the reliability of these annals is questionable, as they survive only in fragments copied in the 12th century. According to the annals the battle took place in the vicinity of Brezalauspurc, the castle of Duke Brazlavo (Braslav), located west of Lake Balaton.

Gallery

References

Populated places in Zala County